Nizhnemaryino is a rural locality (a selo) in Tresorukovskoye Rural Settlement, Liskinsky District, Voronezh Oblast, Russia. The population was 1,190 as of 2010. There are 11 streets.

Geography 
Nizhnemaryino is located 33 km north of Liski (the district's administrative centre) by road. Tresorukovo is the nearest rural locality.

References 

Rural localities in Liskinsky District